Tangail Sadar is an upazila of Tangail District in the Division of Dhaka, Bangladesh.

Geography
It has 69783 households and total area 334.26 km2. The upazila is surrounded by Kalihati Upazila on the north, Nagarpur and Delduar Upazila on the south,   Kalihati and Basail Upazila on the east, and the Jamuna River on the west.

Demographics
As of the 2011 Bangladesh census, Tangail Sadar has a population of 521,104. Males constitute 51.05% of the population, and females 48.95%. Tangail Sadar has an average literacy rate of 53.1% (7+ years).

Administration
Tangail Sadar Upazila is divided into Tangail Municipality and 12 union parishads: Baghil, Danya, Gala, Gharinda, Hugra, Karatia, Katuli, Kakua, Magra, Mahamudnagar, Porabari, and Silimpur. The union parishads are subdivided into 247 mauzas and 276 villages.

Tangail Municipality is subdivided into 18 wards and 64 mahallas.

See also
Union Councils of Tangail District
Upazilas of Bangladesh
Districts of Bangladesh
Divisions of Bangladesh

References

 
Upazilas of Tangail District